Abdullah Al-Yazidi (Arabic:عبد الله اليزيدي) (born 12 August 1989) is a Qatari footballer. He currently plays for Al-Shahania.

External links
 

Qatari footballers
1989 births
Living people
Al-Khor SC players
Umm Salal SC players
Al-Shahania SC players
Al-Rayyan SC players
Qatar Stars League players
Qatari Second Division players
Association football forwards